Bahía Concepción is a bay on the Gulf of California, in southeastern Mulegé Municipality and the central-eastern part of the Baja California Peninsula, in Baja California Sur state, Mexico.

It one of the largest bays of the Baja California Peninsula.

Features
Bahía Concepción features over 50 miles of beaches. Some of the more popular beaches include (from north to south) Playa Los Naranjos, Playa Punta Arena, Playa Santispac, Playa Escondida, Playa Los Cocos, Playa El Coyote, Playa Buenaventure, Playa El Requeson, Playa Armenta.

Entry into the sheltered bays near Playa Santispac is marked by a lighthouse on Isla Pitahaya.

Close to Mapachitos area, hydrothermal manifestations can be found, related to the opening of the Gulf of California.

References

Bays of Mexico on the Pacific Ocean
Gulf of California
Landforms of Baja California Sur
Mulegé Municipality